is a professional Japanese baseball player. He plays pitcher for the Niigata Albirex Baseball Club.

External links

 NPB.com

1980 births
Living people
Baseball people from Yokohama
Japanese baseball players
Nippon Professional Baseball pitchers
Seibu Lions players
Saitama Seibu Lions players
Yokohama DeNA BayStars players
Japanese baseball coaches
Nippon Professional Baseball coaches